"Finishing the Hat" is the 180th episode and the second part of the two-hour series finale of the ABC television series Desperate Housewives. It is the twenty-third and final episode of the show's eighth season and was broadcast on May 13, 2012. Although the season was promoted as "Kiss Them Goodbye", the series finale was promoted as "The Final Kiss Goodbye".

Plot

Katherine makes a surprise return to the lane, having made a huge amount of money as the owner of a frozen food conglomerate in France, and offers Lynette a job as the head of her United States expansion. Tom recommends she take the job.

Susan reveals to her friends that she is moving. While seeing Julie through the last weeks of her pregnancy, Susan tries to set her up on a date with her obstetrician.

Julie, Gaby, and Susan are all helping Renee on her wedding day. In the limo on the way to the wedding Julie's water breaks. Susan jumps into the driver's seat of the limo and takes Julie to the hospital. Renee arrives at the wedding disheveled and distraught, but the wedding goes off without a hitch. Trip crashes the wedding and finally convinces Bree that he truly cares for her. They kiss and reconcile.

Bree is tasked with getting a particular hard-to-get 45 rpm record and a turntable to play it on for the dying Mrs. McCluskey. On the day of the wedding, Bree stops in and sees that Mrs. McCluskey has the record and turntable and Roy says Trip got it for them.

During a poker game, before Susan's departure, the girls vow that this will not be their last poker game, but as Mary Alice reveals via voice-over, it turns out to be. Lynette and Tom move to New York, where Lynette works as a CEO; they move into a penthouse apartment overlooking Central Park and spend the rest of their lives happily together with their six grandchildren. Gaby and Carlos start a personal shopping website that leads to a show on the Home Shopping Network, and they move to a mansion in California. Bree marries Trip and they move to Louisville, where Bree becomes a member of the Kentucky state legislature.

Reception

Ratings
The finale was watched by 11.12 million American viewers, earning a 3.2/8 rating/share with adults 18–49. It was the most watched program of the night, tied season high ratings with the season 8 premiere "Secrets That I Never Want to Know", and was the most watched episode of the show since the season 7 episode "Searching", watched by 11.35 million viewers. The finale was also up from the previous season's finale "Come on Over for Dinner", which was watched by 10.25 million viewers and received a 3.1 rating in the 18–49 category. The finale was also up from the previous episode "The People Will Hear", which was watched by 9.22 million viewers and received a 2.7/7 rating.
The finale was competing against Survivor: One World Reunion on CBS, which was watched by 7.72 million viewers and held a 2.3/6 rating, and Celebrity Apprentice on NBC, which averaged 5.48 million viewers and held a 1.8/5 rating in the 18–49 demographic. ABC reported that the episode gained an additional 2.1 million viewers (rising to a total of 13.2 million viewers) and 0.9 rating in the 18–49 demographic (rising to a total of a 4.1 rating), in the week following the original broadcast due to DVR recordings.

In Canada, the finale was watched by 1.60 million viewers, placing seventeenth for the week.

Critical reception
The episode received critical acclaim from critics. Reviewers for The Washington Post called the episode "a tidy, affectionate send-off." Sabrina Ford of The Province called it a "happy ending. If it were [filmed in Wisteria Lane], we could count on a happy ending." Christina Tran of TV Fanatic gave the episode a generally positive review, saying "While this final season has had its fair share of ups and downs, I thought that Marc Cherry and company gave us a very satisfying ending. I wasn’t left needing more, but instead, only realizing how much I would truly miss Desperate Housewives." Alberto E. Rodriguez of the Toronto Star called the finale "a fitting way to end the series that was always seen through the eyes of a dead neighbor."

Accolades
This episode was submitted for consideration for Kathryn Joosten due to her nomination for the Primetime Emmy Award for Outstanding Supporting Actress in a Comedy Series at the 64th Primetime Emmy Awards.

For her performance in this episode (and the previous episode, "Give Me The Blame"), Brenda Strong was nominated for her second consecutive Primetime Emmy Award for Outstanding Voice-Over Performance as Mary Alice Young.

Notes

According to show creator Marc Cherry, he had the idea for the final scene featuring one of the women moving off the lane and the ghosts of Wisteria Lane watching over the street, and "kept it in [his] back pocket". Additionally, the original pilot featuring Sheryl Lee as Mary Alice seemingly served as a precursor to the final scene of the series with the ghost of Mary Alice standing in her lawn looking over her friends as they found her suicide note and pondered her secret. This concept was removed from the final version of the pilot that aired.
Edie Britt's ghost is absent in the final scenes because of the lawsuit pending between Nicollette Sheridan and show creator Marc Cherry. In a 2011 interview, Cherry had previously hinted that he wanted to ask Sheridan back for the series finale "to pay homage to everyone who has been on the show". 
When asked why additional dead characters from the past did not appear in the show's final scene – such as Ida Greenberg, Felicia Tilman and Victor Lang — executive producer Sabrina Wind stated that they tried to get everyone but some could not make it.
Actress Kathryn Joosten died of lung cancer on the morning of June 2, 2012, after an 11-year battle with the disease. Coincidentally, her death occurred twenty days after the onscreen death from cancer of the character of Karen McCluskey, which she played, on the final episode of Desperate Housewives. She was diagnosed with lung cancer three times, much like her on-screen character was twice.

References

2012 American television episodes
Desperate Housewives (season 8) episodes
American television series finales
Television pilots within series
Television episodes about weddings